The Scottish Sculpture Open exhibition, sometimes known as the Kildrummy Open, was organised by the Scottish Sculpture Workshop from 1981 to 1997.  The idea was initiated by Fred Bushe (1931–2009), the Founder Director of the Scottish Sculpture Workshop. The exhibition consisted of works drawn from an open call and sometimes included works by invited artists.  It was installed at Kildrummy Castle and some editions of the exhibition toured to other venues.

Participating artists

Publications

 Scottish Sculpture Open, poster, Scottish Sculpture Workshop, 1981
 Scottish Sculpture Open 3, Scottish Sculpture Workshop, 1985
 Scottish Sculpture Open 5, Scottish Sculpture Workshop, 1989
 Scottish Sculpture Open 7, Scottish Sculpture Workshop, 1993
 Scottish Sculpture Open 8, Scottish Sculpture Workshop, 1995
 Scottish Sculpture Open 9, Scottish Sculpture Workshop, 1997

References

External links 
 Scottish Sculpture Workshop

Sculpture exhibitions
1981 establishments in Scotland
Annual events in Scotland
Recurring events established in 1981
Sculptures in Scotland
1997 disestablishments in Scotland
Recurring events disestablished in 1997
Aberdeenshire
Art exhibitions in the United Kingdom